The Laird LC-EW was a six seat cabin sesquiplane designed for the industrialist George Horton. It first flew in 1934.

Design and development

Many Laird aircraft were designated as LC (Laird Commercial). In most cases this was followed by an airframe code, here E and an engine code, here W for Wasp. The LC-EW was designed to an order from the industrialist George Horton, who had previously owned the sole Laird LC-AA, first flown in 1928.

It was a true sesquiplane, with a lower wingspan slightly less than half that of the upper. Both wings were essentially rectangular in plan out to rounded tips. The upper wing was built around spruce spars with plywood ribs and fabric covered. Upper and lower wings were braced together with parallel pairs of wide spread, transverse, streamlined V-struts on each side. Their apices on the lower wing were immediately above the landing legs. Between the fuselage and the legs the lower wing was constructed of Cr/Mo steel tubing and aluminium alloy-skinned; beyond, its structure was the same as that of the upper wing. Aluminium alloy ailerons were hinged only on the upper wings, filling about half the span. The inner lower wing carried flaps of similar construction. Both upper and lower wings contained fuel tanks.

Aft, the fuselage was an all-metal aluminium alloy structure with multiple frames, stiffeners and metal skin. The pilots, or pilot and fifth passenger, sat side by side at the front of the cabin and had dual controls, including a central Y-type control column. Radio was fitted, with an external aerial. The ventilated, heated cabin had three windows on each side and was entered by a starboard-side door; its four passenger seats had safety belts. There was a baggage compartment and toilet at the rear. At the rear the tail was conventional with its cantilever tailplane at mid-fuselage. The tail surfaces were all metal constructions, similar to the fuselage. The tailplane had a blunted triangular profile and carried blunted rectangular elevators. Fin and unbalanced rudder had similar profiles to the horizontal tail plans.

Each had a pneumatically-tyred wheel, also under a fairing. The castoring tail wheel was also on an oleo strut.

Operational history

Little is known about its short history in Horton's ownership. He died in 1935 and the LC-EW was bequeathed to the aeronautical department of the  Rensselaer Institute.

Specifications

References

Sesquiplanes
Single-engined tractor aircraft
1930s United States civil utility aircraft
Laird aircraft